Djurgården will in the 2005 season compete in the Allsvenskan, Svenska Cupen and UEFA Cup

Squad information

Squad

Player statistics
Appearances for competitive matches only.

|}

Goals

Total

Allsvenskan

Svenska Cupen

Royal League

Competitions

Overall

Allsvenskan

League table

Results summary

Matches

Svenska Cupen

2nd round

3rd round

4th round

Quarter-finals

Semi-finals

Final

UEFA Cup

UEFA Cup 1st round

2004–05 Royal League

1st group stage

2005–06 Royal League

Group stage

The tournament continued in the 2006 season.

Friendlies

Djurgårdens IF Fotboll seasons
Djurgarden
Swedish football championship-winning seasons